Peribasis is a genus of longhorn beetles of the subfamily Lamiinae, containing the following species:

 Peribasis helenor (Newman, 1851)
 Peribasis larvata (White, 1858)
 Peribasis pubicollis Pascoe, 1866

References

Lamiini